A Wife's Life is an eight-minute film made in 1950 by filmmaker Pete Smith, who also narrates.  It is directed by Dave O'Brien and written by Dave O'Brien and Julian Harmon.  The film is narrated in Smith's classic nasally matter-of-fact comedic delivery and is shot as a mockumentary of sorts.

Plot 
Mrs. George T. Hardnose is an average mid-century housewife burdened by her aloof and patriarchal husband.  She calls her husband to say she wants to go to a movie that night; he says, nothing doing, he's tired, he's worked hard, and what has she done all day. In a series of flashbacks, we see - starting with getting George out of bed and off to work, bathing an obstreperous three-year-old, dealing with stopped drains and a faulty defroster, doing dishes, cajoling a rich uncle, washing clothes, mopping floors, sweeping behind heavy furniture, cleaning the stove and a rug, and cooking dinner. When George asks her after dinner to let him have the paper, she cracks him over the head with a metal pipe wrapped in the paper.

References

External links 
 
 

1950 films
Films produced by Pete Smith (film producer)
American black-and-white films
1950s English-language films